The Iron Woman is a science fiction novel by British writer Ted Hughes, published in 1993. It is a sequel to the 1968 novel The Iron Man.

Story
"The Iron Woman has come to take revenge on mankind for its thoughtless polluting of the seas, lakes and rivers," says the introduction to the novel. It references rudeness, in that the iron woman exacts her revenge on a seemingly ignorant/uncaring male community (in the waste disposal plant) for polluting the area in which she lives; however, the book is more of an attack on society for the oblivious ways in which for many decades, a vast number of habitats have been destroyed or are on the brink of annihilation or complete destruction or obliteration. Ted Hughes' novel is an attempt at getting people to be made aware of and respond to this.

Synopsis
The main character, Lucy, finds the Iron Woman in a state of despair and covered in chemicals. After being cleaned (by Lucy), the Iron Woman takes her to see the environment in which she lives. Lucy sympathises with the Iron Woman, watching the animals' painful deaths as more toxic material is poured into the marsh from the local waste-disposal factory. She is angry and wants to save them, but her dad is one of the factory workers. Lucy contacts Hogarth, the friend of the Iron Man, asking for his help.  The Iron Woman is so enraged that she turns all the men in the factory into the swamp creatures, so that they can feel what the animals of the marsh were enduring. They all burp black bubbles of cloud, which the next day form the Cloud Spider: "I am the Spider-god of wealth. Wealth. Wealth. The Spider-god of more and more and more and more money. I catch it in my web." The Cloud Spider is taken away by the Space-Bat-Angel-Dragon from the first novel of 1968, The Iron Man.

When the Iron Woman turns the men back to their human forms, all their hair is white, as though it has been bleached or they have aged.

Reception

The book had a mostly positive reception from critics.

References

1993 British novels
Novels by Ted Hughes
British science fiction novels
British children's novels
1993 science fiction novels
Children's science fiction novels
Sequel novels
Faber and Faber books
1993 children's books
Fictional humanoid robots